The Lawless Breed is a 1953 American Technicolor Biographical Western film produced and distributed by Universal-International, directed by Raoul Walsh, and starring Rock Hudson and Julie Adams. The film is a romanticized story based on the life of outlaw John Wesley Hardin.

Plot
Wild West gunslinger and gambler John Wesley Hardin (Rock Hudson) is pardoned and released from Huntsville, Texas prison in 1896, after serving 16 years of a 25-year sentence.

He delivers a manuscript of his life, written during his incarceration, to a local printer, in the hopes of it being printed. The film's story is presented mostly as flashbacks, as the autobiography recounts Hardin's exploits outside the law.

It tells of an upbringing by his preacher father (John McIntire), and his first love Jane (Mary Castle); in his reckless youth he find solace from his complicated home life in gambling. However he is introduced to the outlaw life when he shoots a man (Michael Ansara) in self-defense during a card game, and is soon on the run when authorities, and the man's notorious brothers (Hugh O'Brian, Lee Van Cleef, Glenn Strange), come gunning for him. He finds aid from a saloon girl friend Rosie (Julie Adams) and his uncle John Clements (also played by McIntire). After Jane is killed in an accident outside his father's home, brought on by the pursuit and Hardin's desire to bring her with him, he and Rosie depart together. On the run across state lines and using aliases, they eventually wed and begin a normal life, and have a son just before he is finally tracked down, captured and sent to prison.

After his release, he returns home and reunites with Rosie and his now teenage son John (Race Gentry). His life as an outlaw has influenced his son, but on his release Hardin makes clear to the young man that a life of crime is no way to live.

Cast
 Rock Hudson as John Wesley Hardin
 Julie Adams as Rosie (as Julia Adams)
 Mary Castle as Jane Brown
 John McIntire as J.G.Hardin / John Clements
 Hugh O'Brian as Ike Hanley
 Dennis Weaver as Jim Clements
 Forrest Lewis as Zeke Jenkins
 Lee Van Cleef as Dirk Hanley
 Tom Fadden as Chick Noonan
 Race Gentry as John Hardin jr
 Richard Garland as Joe Clements
 Glenn Strange as Ben Hanley
 William Pullen as Joe Hardin
 Michael Ansara as Gus Hanley (uncredited)

Francis Ford, the brother of director John Ford, has a small uncredited role as a saloon janitor.

Home media
Universal first released the film on DVD in 2007 as part of its Classic Western Round-Up, Volume 1 set, a 2-disc set featuring three other films (The Texas Rangers, Canyon Passage, and Kansas Raiders). The exact same set was re-released in 2011, as part of Universal's 4 Movie Marathon DVD series, being repackaged as the "Classic Western Collection". In 2015, the film re-released as a stand-alone DVD from the Universal Vault Series; the only difference in this release was that no subtitles were provided on-screen. There are also Region 2 and Region 4 DVD releases of this film.

References

External links

1953 films
1953 Western (genre) films
1950s English-language films
American Western (genre) films
Biographical films about people of the American Old West
Films directed by Raoul Walsh
Films scored by Herman Stein
Revisionist Western (genre) films
Universal Pictures films
1950s American films